Totally Blonde is a 2001 comedy film written and directed by Andrew Van Slee, and starring Krista Allen, Maeve Quinlan, and Michael Bublé. The musical soundtrack  was released as the album Totally Bublé.

The airhead comedy was Bublé's second film, after a bit part as a singer in Duets (2000) starring Gwyneth Paltrow and Huey Lewis, and followed by a role as Hap in The Snow Walker (2003).
The soundtrack, which was moderately successful, was soon followed by his first major label release Michael Bublé (2003).

Plot

Meg Peters just cannot seem to find Mr. Right, until one day she bleaches her hair blonde. 
Men begin to swarm around, but none she feels is Mr. Right until she meets crooner Van (Michael Bublé) at a local club. The plot thickens when she also meets an old high-school friend, now a wealthy hunk (Brody Hutzler).
Typical situations follow, such as a scene where she stands up Van for a date with Hutzler, and Van ends up making out with her girlfriend played by Maeve Quinlan.
In the end, everything turns out alright with Meg and Van living happily ever after.

Cast

Reception

One critic describes the film as a "fairly disastrous romantic comedy", but says that Bublé's music, written by Van Slee, helps redeem it, as does the generally likable cast.

References

Further reading

2001 films
2000s English-language films